The Bush's Beans 200 is an annual 200-lap  ARCA Menards Series and ARCA Menards Series East combination race held at Bristol Motor Speedway. It is held as part of the fall NASCAR weekend at the track.

The event was run under the NASCAR K&N Pro Series East banner for its inaugural edition in 2019 before becoming a combination race for the East Series (now the ARCA East Series after NASCAR's acquisition of ARCA) and the ARCA Menards Series starting in 2020. Since 2021, the race has been the season-finale for the East Series. Starting in 2022, the race has been the final race of the Sioux Chief Showdown, a group of 10 races during the main ARCA Series season, all of which drivers under the age of 18 (who cannot run all the races during the season) are eligible to compete in, have the opportunity to win a championship in the series. (To promote the fact that it was the last race of the Sioux Chief Showdown in 2022, ARCA's website promoted the race as the Bush's Beans 200|Sioux Chief Showdown.)

History

In advance of the 2019 NASCAR K&N Pro Series East season, the tour added a second event at Bristol. The race was then shifted to the ARCA Menards Series after the East Series was absorbed by ARCA. Due to the COVID-19 pandemic, the race became a combination race for the AMS and the East Series, now known as the ARCA Menards Series East, in 2020, and it has remained a combination race for both series ever since.

Past winners

References

External links
 

ARCA Menards Series races
ARCA Menards Series
ARCA Menards Series East
Recurring sporting events established in 2019
2019 establishments in Tennessee
NASCAR races at Bristol Motor Speedway
Motorsport in Tennessee